Drain the Oceans is an Australian and British documentary television series that premiered on 28 May 2018 on National Geographic. The 25-part factual series is hosted by Russell Boulter, and explores shipwrecks, treasure and sunken cities using underwater scanning system, scientific data, and art digital recreations. Andrew Ogilvie from Electric Pictures and Crispin Sadler from Mallinson Sadler Productions produced the series for National Geographic. Drain The Oceans was preceded by similar National Geographic productions: Drain the Great Lakes, Drain the Titanic and Drain the Bermuda Triangle. The series is available in the form of a 10-part season and a 15-part season on iTunes. Season 4 began airing on National Geographic as of 2 August 2021.

Series overview

Background and production

Visual effects 
Last Pixel has provided over 70 minutes of computer-generated imagery (CGI) and other visual effects for 5 episodes of season 2.

Episodes

Season 1 (2018)

Season 2 (2019)

Season 3 (2020)

Season 4 (2021)

Season 5 (2022–2023)

Specials

Accolades

Notes

References

External links 
 

National Geographic (American TV channel) original programming
2010s Australian documentary television series
2010s British documentary television series
2016 Australian television series debuts
2016 British television series debuts
Television series by Electric Pictures